The Kandawgyi Palace Hotel was a five-star hotel and historical landmark overlooking the Kandawgyi Lake in Yangon, Myanmar.  The hotel caught fire on the morning of Thursday, 19 October 2017 and was destroyed.

History
The Kandawgyi Palace Hotel, built in 1934, started out as a two-story, red-brick building to house the Rangoon Rowing Club. It was a regular retreat for British officers who occupied British Burma at the time. It was then used by the Japanese as a welfare department during their occupation during World War II. After the war and when Burma had gained independence, the property became the National Biological Museum in 1948. The site first began operating as a hotel in 1979, when the Ministry of Hotels and Tourism took over. The hotel featured 10 bungalows made of teak. They were eventually replaced in 1993 by a larger lakeside building resembling traditional Southeast Asian architecture. The hotel was bought out by the Htoo Group of Companies, which was founded by Tay Za, a controversial Burmese tycoon who was closely linked to the country's former head of state, Than Shwe.

Fire of 2017
At 3:15 in the morning of Thursday, 19 October, 2017, a devastating fire broke out. The cause was believed to have been an electrical fault. The fire was fed by gas canisters that burst from the boiler room. Eighty fire trucks were brought in to try to control the blaze, but the teak building was gutted. The hotel had 96 occupied rooms with a total of 141 guests. One man and a lady perished, a firefighter was treated for smoke inhalation, and a guest was treated after jumping from one of the hotel's upper windows.

References 

Buildings and structures in Yangon
Resorts in Myanmar
Hotels in Myanmar
The Leading Hotels of the World
Hotel buildings completed in 1934
Defunct hotels
1934 establishments in Burma